Mullach Coire Mhic Fhearchair (1,015 m) is a mountain in the Northwest Highlands of Wester Ross, Scotland. It lies in the remote Dundonnell and Fisherfield Forest.

The ridge is covered in large quartzite boulders, which makes it a difficult peak to climb. Some climbers will wildcamp next to nearby Loch Fhada before they ascend the mountain. The nearest village is Kinlochewe to the south.

References

Mountains and hills of the Northwest Highlands
Marilyns of Scotland
Munros
One-thousanders of Scotland